Anđelko Ćuk (born 30 May 1983) is a volleyball player.

Clubs
 OK Ljubinje (1999–2001)
 Radnik Bijeljina (2001–2002)
 HAOK Mladost (2002–2007)
 Daejeon Samsung Bluefangs (2007–2009)
 Toyoda Gosei Trefuerza (2009–2011)
 Suwon KEPCO Vixtorm (2011–2013)
 ACH Volley (2013–2014)
 Al-Ain SCC (2014)
 Pamvohaikos V.C. (2014–2015)
 Speedball Chekka (2015-2016)
 Maccabi Tel Aviv (2016-2017)
 Acqua Fonteviva Massa (2017-2018)
 Partizan Belgrade (2018/19)
 Hapoel Mate (2019)
 Jedinsto Stara Pazova (2019-2020)
Radnik Bijeljina (2020/2021)

References

External links
 

1983 births
Living people
Croatian men's volleyball players
Daejeon Samsung Bluefangs players
Toyoda Gosei Trefuerza players
Suwon KEPCO Vixtorm players